I Go Crazy may refer to:

"I Go Crazy" (Paul Davis song), 1977, and subsequently released by Barry Manilow
"I Go Crazy" (Flesh for Lulu song), 1987 
"I Go Crazy", a bonus track on the Queen album The Works
"I Go Crazy", a song by Huey from Redemption

See also
Going Crazy (disambiguation)